Miskolctapolca or Miskolc-Tapolca (formerly Görömböly-Tapolca, planned to be Tapolcafürdő after gaining independence from Miskolc, in colloquial speech known as Tapolca) is a suburb of Miskolc, and is one of the most popular tourist towns of Hungary. Not to be confused with Tapolca town in Veszprém County.

History

The area has been inhabited since ancient times. The archaeological findings can be seen in the Ottó Herman Museum. Before the Hungarians conquered the area, it was inhabited by Slavic tribes. Its name comes from a Slavic word meaning bath and was first mentioned by Anonymus.

Documents dating back to 1219 mention a Benedictine monastery in Tapolca; it stood until the 16th century, but during the Ottoman occupation of Hungary the monastery was attacked several times and the monks left. Tapolca remained without permanent residents until the 19th century, although it was used as a holiday resort already in the early 18th century. At this time it belonged to the monastery of Görömböly. The bishop of Vác asked the monastery to develop Tapolca as a holiday resort; three pools were built for the thermal water, and an inn was built too. By 1830 there was an indoor bath too.

In the end of the 19th century the city of Miskolc bought Tapolca from the Church. In 1934 Tapolca officially became a resort town, and began to prosper, restaurants, hotels were opened. By 1941 the new building of the bath was built. In 1959 the Cave Bath was opened, and in 1969 an open-air pool was built too.

In 1950 the village Görömböly, to which Tapolca belonged to, was annexed to Miskolc. Since then Tapolca is called Miskolc-Tapolca.

On 16 January 2005 there was a plebiscite regarding the independence of Tapolca from Miskolc, but the majority of the votes agreed on staying a part of Miskolc. On 7 December 2008 a new plebiscite was held, this time 835 persons voted for Tapolca's independence and 591 voted against.

Tourist attractions

 The 150m long Cave Bath is one of the most beautiful baths of Hungary. It has both indoor and open-air pools, some of them are in a large natural cave. The Cave Bath is open all year.
 In front of the Cave Bath there is a large park with a boat lake.
 There is another bath in Tapolca, with open-air swimming pools.
 The Cave Chapel is a chapel in a small natural cave. Roman Catholic mass is held on every Sunday.

How to get there
 By car: from south (Eger, Budapest) on Highway 3; from East (Debrecen) on Road 35 until Nyékládháza, then on Road 3; from North on Road 26.
 By bus: Take Bus 2 from Miskolc, Búza tér. If you arrive by train, take any Miskolc tram from Tiszai station, leave the tram at Szemere street and take Bus 2.

Other data
 Population: 4693 (2001)
 Postal code: 3519
 Distance from Downtown Miskolc: 4,8 km

Trivia
The town holds the country's record for lowest temperature (−35.0 °C on 16 February 1940)

Sources

External links
 Official site (Hungarian only)

 Miskolctapolca info on SeeUinHungary.com

Neighbourhoods of Miskolc
Spa towns in Hungary